The Indigo Tribe is a fictional organization that appears in DC Comics publications, primarily those of the Green Lantern series. In the DC Universe, it is one of the seven major groups known as the Corps of the emotional spectrum. The group was created by comic book writer Geoff Johns and comic book artist Ethan Van Sciver. It made its debut in the issue #25 of Green Lantern (vol. 4) in December 2007.

Background
The Indigo Tribe is one of the nine Corps of the emotional spectrum within the DC Universe setting. Each "Emotional Spectrum" Corps has both a corresponding color of the rainbow and an emotional theme attached to it, with several of the Corps (e.g. the Green Lantern Corps and Red Lantern Corps) being named after their respective color; the Indigo Tribe, which is one of the Corps named after their associated color, uses indigo-light-powered rings and staffs. Its emotional theme is compassion.

The group first appeared in issue #25 of Green Lantern (vol. 4), published in December 2007, where it is described as having a reclusive nature that makes it the most elusive group among its peers; the Tribe's stated purpose is to spread goodwill throughout the universe.

In a March 2009 interview with Newsarama, creator Geoff Johns said that the Indigo Tribe would be introduced within the upcoming Blackest Night series. "I've been very careful with Indigo because they're not what everyone expects, and they act very differently than what everyone expects." In April 2009, artist Ed Benes posted the artwork for the companion mini-series Blackest Night: Tales of the Corps, which features a member from each of the Seven Corps; the solicitation copy announced "the first appearance of the mysterious Indigo, leader of the Indigo Tribe!" Johns later revealed the leader's name to be Indigo-1. The June 2009 Blackest Night #0 promotional material describes the group as being unknown to the DC Universe at large.

The Indigo Tribe made its first extended appearance in the July 2009 issue Blackest Night: Tales of the Corps #1. Ethan Van Sciver, who created the initial design for the Indigo Tribe, said that members of the group abandon everything and devote themselves to compassion. Their uniforms have a basic, hand-made appearance, their bodies are adorned with the Indigo Lantern symbol written in body paint, and they carry carved, lantern-like staffs with them. Van Sciver also designed the staff, which he wanted to look "lovingly handmade by people who had better things to do than make themselves look good," and said that his initial thoughts were that the Tribe would be opposites to the Orange Lanterns.

Group history
The Indigo Tribe is a major participant in the Blackest Night crossover storylines, covered by Blackest Night #0-#8 (May 2009-March 2010), and Blackest Night: Tales of the Corps #1-#3 (July 2009). The group is involved in one of the arcs in the follow-up Brightest Day storyline, specifically in Green Lantern (vol.4) #53-62, where it and other representatives of the Lantern Corps attempt to find the Entities of the emotional spectrum. Indigo-1 participates in the War of the Green Lanterns storyline that is covered in Green Lantern (vol. 4) #63-67, Green Lantern Corps (vol. 2) #58-60, and Green Lantern: Emerald Warriors #8-10 The Indigo Tribe is active in The New 52 storylines from Green Lantern (vol. 5).

Blackest Night
A group of Indigo Tribesmen, led by Indigo-1, traverses a desert landscape in Sector 3544, where it observes explosive displays of green and yellow light in the distance. The group investigates the site and finds a wounded porcine Green Lantern Corps member lying on the ground. He reports that he was in a conflict with a "being who knows no mercy," and despite his coughing up blood, difficulty speaking, and open head injuries, he tells the group to stay away so as to not attract the being's attention. Indigo-1 says something, but when the Green Lantern member asks his ring to translate, it replies that it cannot, despite having a catalog of known languages in the DC Universe. Indigo-1 kneels and places her hand on his heart; her indigo power ring responds with the word "will". Drawing power from him, she creates a simple green light construct that smothers him. Although he struggles, she persists, and smothers him until he is dead. The attacker, a member of Sinestro Corps, emerges and exclaims that he will not be taken down as easily as he fires a beam of yellow energy at Indigo-1; however, Indigo-1 is not fazed by his threat; her power staff absorbs the beam. As her power ring says "fear", she creates a monstrous yellow light construct that frightens her attacker away.

Indigo-1 and Munk arrive on Earth to help Hal Jordan, the Flash, and the Atom escape from a group of Black Lanterns, which are former superheroes that have been reanimated. Indigo-1 channels Jordan's green light through her staff, and turns Black Lanterns Elongated Man and Sue Dibny to ash by destroying their rings. Indigo-1 and Munk teleport the group to the Hall of Justice where it is revealed that they can speak English "when they wish to." Indigo-1 explains that, in the beginning, the DC Universe is only darkness until light becomes strong enough to suppress it. As the darkness fights back, it shatters the light into the seven colors of the emotional spectrum. She explains that the Black Lanterns can only truly be defeated if the Corps work together. If all seven Corps cooperate, they can recreate the white light of creation and permanently destroy the Black Lanterns and their power source. As a group of Black Lanterns infiltrates the Hall of Justice, Indigo-1 and Munk escape with Jordan. They go to the planet Zamaron, where they save Carol Ferris and Sinestro from a Black Lantern onslaught. Indigo-1 brings Jordan, Ferris, and Sinestro to Korugar, where Sinestro defeats Mongul and becomes the leader of Sinestro Corps. Meanwhile, Munk transports himself to Oa, and assists the Green Lanterns against their fallen comrades, who have been reanimated as Black Lanterns. Indigo-1, along with Hal Jordan, Sinestro, Carol Ferris and Saint Walker, go to Okaara to recruit Atrocitus and Larfleeze.  After the pair agrees, the group travels to Ryut but discovers that the Black Central Power Battery has been moved to Earth. The group goes to Earth; Indigo-1 and the allied members combine powers to make the white light of creation to try to destroy the battery; however, the light is insufficient. Meanwhile, Nekron, the leader of the Black Lanterns, expands his army by resurrecting more former superheroes and converting them into Black Lanterns.

Indigo-1 and her allies encounter "the Entity" which is explained as the embodiment of life itself in the DC Universe. Hal Jordan bonds with the Entity; they convert the Black Lanterns into White Lanterns, and bring back Black Hand. Without Black Hand as a tether, Nekron is eventually defeated and destroyed. Afterwards, Saint Walker says that the Indigo Tribe has disappeared. The Indigo Tribe is shown in a vast procession led by Indigo-1 and Munk. The tribe members tow a shackled Black Hand, who bears an imprint of the Indigo Tribe symbol and carries a power staff.

Brightest Day
During the search for the emotional entities, Indigo-1 returns to Earth to infuse Proselyte, the Indigo Tribe's emotional entity, into Shane Thompson, a paramedic who prioritized the care of a mortally wounded patient over a less-wounded man that had insurance. Indigo-1 and Black Hand revisit Hal Jordan, Barry Allen, Sinestro, Saint Walker and Larfleeze. Black Hand explains that the ring has "cured" him of William Hand's sickness. The others realize that the Indigo Tribe cannot feel any emotion without the rings. Given Hand's role in Blackest Night, Jordan suspects that other Indigo Tribe members may have committed evil deeds in the past. The Indigo Tribe offers to take the remaining emotional entities into protective custody, but Jordan declines. Parallax takes over Flash, and wants to take over Jordan. Adara, the entity of hope, fights a cloaked villain who reveals himself to be Krona, who has been planning on capturing all of the Entities with the gathering. Proselyte frees Flash from Parallax's control by reigniting his emotion for compassion over his fear.

War of the Green Lanterns
In the War of the Green Lanterns storyline, Krona has trapped Indigo-1 and the allied Corps members in the Book of the Black, where they are forced to re-live their lives prior to acquiring their current rings. Meanwhile, John Stewart, whose Green Lantern ring has been contaminated by Krona and Parallax, bears Indigo-1's ring, but has trouble trying to wield its power. When Sinestro tries to break free of the book, he finds in a prison cell Indigo-1, who went by the name Iroque prior to joining the Indigo Tribe.  Iroque angrily proclaims that she will escape whatever Abin Sur has planned for her. When Kyle Rayner frees her from the book, Iroque does not remember her Indigo-1 identity until she puts on her indigo ring.

The New 52
In September 2011, The New 52 rebooted DC's continuity. In this new timeline, the Indigo Tribe learns that Sinestro is returning to Earth to assume his old role of Green Lantern. Sinestro asks Hal Jordan to work with him as the Guardians are planning to replace the Green Lantern Corps with the Third Army; however, the Indigo Tribe goes to Earth and captures Sinestro. Jordan follows them to Nok, the Indigo homeworld, but he is captured and delivered to Indigo Tribe member Black Hand. Jordan tricks Black Hand into recharging his ring, and escapes; however, he discovers that Sinestro has been forcibly inducted into the Indigo Tribe.

As he flees into the jungles of Nok, Jordan finds the Indigo Central Battery and meets its guardian, Natromo, who tells him of the Indigo Tribe's history. The group is originally created to fight the Guardians in case they ever become mad with power. Abin Sur discovers the Indigo light on the planet Nok during a mission; he and Natromo forge it into a battery. Sur brings Iroque, his mortal enemy who killed his daughter, and converts her to become the first Indigo Tribe member. The others are selected from the most dangerous criminals and psychopaths of their worlds. Sur foresees the danger that the Guardians would pose once the Blackest Night passes, and seeks a way to stop the Guardians by converting them instead of fighting them. However, when Jordan reveals that Sur is dead, Natromo destroys the battery, believing that there is no hope with Abin Sur dead. This restores Sinestro to normal, just as Jordan is discovered, but leaves them at the hands of the once-again-psychotic former Tribesmen.

Jordan and Sinestro are pursued by the former Tribesmen through the forests of Nok. They run into Natromo, who is on his way back to his people. Jordan asks Natromo to reforge the Indigo Central Battery, but Natromo says that it is an impossible task since the compassion within the battery has already dissipated throughout the universe, and it will take weeks to forge more out of the rivers of Nok. They are then approached by Iroque, who begs Natromo to find a way to restore their rings. The sadness and compassion she feels for what she did to Abin Sur and his daughter is the spark that enables Natromo to reforge the battery. As a result, the former Tribesmen and Sinestro become members of the Tribe again, although Black Hand refuses to submit to the process by leaping to his death. Jordan implores the Indigo Tribe to release Sinestro; Indigo-1 agrees, but only on the condition that Jordan swear that Sinestro can be redeemed without having to use an indigo ring.

Meanwhile, Munk has joined the New Guardians as the representative for the Indigo Tribe. He works alongside Fatality as they investigate the Orrery that has turned Kyle Rayner into a ring magnet. In the New Guardians' fight against Larfleeze, Munk duplicates Larfleeze's ring, which proves to be the New Guardians' only effective weapon against Larfleeze.

Members

Prominent members
In Blackest Night: Tales of the Corps #1, the Indigo Tribe is presented as a Corps that travels in a large nomadic procession. Indigo-1 explains that the group eschews everything associated with individualism, including names. However, while interacting with others, some members allow themselves to be addressed by name:
  (Iroque) (Sector unknown): A violet-skinned female humanoid who serves as the chosen leader of the Indigo Tribe. Unlike the other members of the tribe, Indigo-1 wears indigo-colored garments. During Blackest Night, she helps Hal Jordan assemble members from each of the Lantern Corps to combat the Black Lanterns. She claims to have once met Abin Sur at a time when she was "self-centered and self-important". Sinestro later encounters a pre-Tribe version of her in the Book of the Black where she waits in a prison cell for Abin Sur to pass judgment on her. Her original identity is revealed to be Iroque, Sur's greatest enemy, who is responsible for the death of his daughter. She becomes the first person to convert to the Indigo Tribe. When she is freed from her ring, she initially reverts to her old, violent personality; however, because of the previous influence of the Indigo power of compassion, she comes to regret her actions, and begs to have her ring and status returned.
  (Sector unknown): A humanoid who acts as the Indigo Tribe's second-in-command. He accompanies Indigo-1 to Earth, and then to Zamaron, before teleporting himself to Oa in order to assist the Green Lantern Corps. Munk represented the Indigo Tribe in the Green Lantern: New Guardians series before the team was disbanded.
 Natromo: An inhabitant of planet Nok, Natromo is the Keeper of the Indigo Light; however, he does not wield an Indigo Power Ring or Staff, so the light of compassion has no influence over him. He and Sur created the first Indigo Tribe ring. While Sur leaves the planet, Natromo remains and forges more rings to convert the worst beings from the other worlds into Indigo Tribe members.
 Kreaven (Sector unknown): A bird-like alien, who was the worst psychopath on his world.
 Slog the Slayer (Sector unknown): Slog is also a former psychopath who was converted to a member of the Indigo Tribe.

Former members
 John Stewart (of Sector 2814): During the Brightest Day and War of the Green Lanterns storyline, after Krona launches his attack on Oa and restores Parallax to the Green Central Battery, Stewart is forced to remove his green power ring to avoid being contaminated by the yellow impurity. Later Hal Jordan gives Stewart Indigo-1's ring so he can fight Krona, and while at first he cannot control the Indigo power properly, he later masters the ability to the point that he can tap into the remnants of the Black Lantern Corps around Mogo's core.
 Atom (Ray Palmer) (of Sector 2814): A professor at Pace University, who is the second variation of the superhero known as the Atom and selected by an Indigo Power Ring as a deputy member of the Indigo Tribe during the Blackest Night crisis. He is later discharged from the Tribe after the final battle. He is the only known Indigo Tribe member selected by a ring because of his abundance of compassion instead of his lack of it.
  (of Sector 2814): A paramedic who was pinned under an ambulance in an accident, yet still attempted to help the wounded. Instead of becoming a regular member of the Indigo Tribe, Thompson becomes the host for Proselyte, the Indigo Tribe's entity of compassion. He is later discharged after Krona captures Proselyte.
 Thaal Sinestro (of Sector 1417): In The New 52 storyline, he is captured by and forcibly recruited into the Indigo Tribe. He is freed when guardian Natromo destroys the Indigo Central Battery. When Natromo later restores the battery, Sinestro becomes a member again, but Hal Jordan implores the Indigo Tribe to release Sinestro, so he can be redeemed without the aid of an indigo ring.
 Black Hand (William Hand) (of Sector 2814): In the final issue of Blackest Night, Black Hand is seen with the Indigo Tribe as a prisoner and recently converted member. In Green Lantern (vol.4) #56, he is with the Tribe on Earth. In The New 52 storyline, he is tricked by Hal Jordan into recharging Jordan's ring. He is freed when guardian Natromo destroys the Indigo Central Battery. When the battery is later restored, he kills himself rather than return to the Indigo Tribe. A Black Power Ring later emerges from his corpse and revives him as a Black Lantern.
 Krona (of sector 0): Krona temporarily becomes a member of the Indigo Tribe during the War of the Green Lanterns story line when he puts on Indigo-1's power ring. After he's killed, the power ring returns to Indigo-1.

Oath
As with the other Corps of the emotional spectrum, the Indigo Tribe charges its rings by reciting an oath, but uses a power staff instead of a power battery. In its first extended appearance, the Indigo Tribe speaks a language that the power ring cannot translate, although Indigo-1 later explains that her Tribe can speak languages others can understand. Regardless, the oath has only been rendered in the aforementioned fictional language. Johns has said that the Corps oaths have a tempo regardless of what language they are spoken in, adding: "But speaking of languages, the Indigo Tribe speaks an interesting one."

Entity: Proselyte

 is the embodiment of compassion; it is the emotional spectrum entity for the Indigo Tribe. The entity is revealed during the Blackest Night storyline. In Green Lantern (vol. 4) #52, Proselyte's origins is explained as: "Rage grows from murder. Hope from Prayer. And at last, compassion is offered to us all." It takes the form of a cephalopod with four visible appendages, which represent its reaching out to offer itself to all living beings. Its inner surface is lined with features that resemble the Indigo Tribe's insignia.

In the Brightest Day storyline, Proselyte is attracted by the Entity to Earth, where it is heavily sought after by the Indigo Tribe, the allied Corps members and Krona. Atrocitus uses a divining ritual and locates Proselyte in the mid-Atlantic United States. The Indigo Tribe finds Proselyte and uses its powers to convert Black Hand to the Tribe. Proselyte possesses the body of Shane Thompson, a paramedic who cares full-heartedly for his dying patients. In human form, it is able to "exorcise" Parallax from Barry Allen's body by using the energy of the various spectra.

Proselyte and the emotional entity Adara are captured by Krona. After he invades Oa, Krona forces Proselyte to possess one of the Guardians of the Universe. Proselyte is eventually freed when Hal Jordan kills Krona. Afterwards, it remains at large in the Universe.

While the Indigo Tribe members are capable of channeling only one emotion at a time, Proselyte is capable of channeling all emotions in the area at once.
Proselyte soon began suffering from a strange illness, later revealed to be the reservoir of the emotional spectrum was becoming exhausted. After Relic wiped out the Blue Lantern Corps and forcefully drained the green light from Oa's Central Power Battery and destroying the planet in the process, Proselyte sacrifices himself by passing into the Source Wall in order for the reservoir to be refilled.

Powers and abilities

The Indigo Tribe harnesses the indigo light of compassion. Robin S. Rosenberg, a clinical psychologist and editor of the anthology The Psychology of Superheroes, describes compassion as being able to have empathy for someone while maintaining enough distance to understand their motivations.

The indigo ring has basic power ring abilities such as flight and aura projection, as shown on the cover of Blackest Night: Tales of the Corps #3. Members can use indigo light to teleport themselves and others over vast intergalactic distances; this drains much of the ring's power, so the wearer uses it sparingly. The indigo light can also heal individuals with great empathy but exposes people to the pain they have inflicted on others.

The Indigo Tribe distinguishes itself from the other Corps in that a member uses a power staff instead of power battery to charge the indigo ring, as depicted in Blackest Night #5. Unlike the power battery lanterns, the staff appears to be a part of the Indigo Tribe's uniform, appearing whenever a user puts on the ring and transforms into costume.

The Indigo ring not only stores indigo light energy, but also is capable of channeling the energy of other emotional lights; the ring can therefore emulate the abilities from other Corps. In Blackest Night, Indigo-1 and Munk use a combination of different emotional lights to destroy members of the Black Lantern Corps. Black Hand is able to charge Hal Jordan's ring with green light although it is not as powerful as a standard charging. In Green Lantern Corps (vol. 2) #42, Munk explains that this ability is only effective from "direct and intimate discharges." Whereas a Corps member projects a light display in front of the emblem on the uniform when using abilities, the Indigo Tribe member projects the Corps symbol in an indigo light display from the "pod" on the staff. When the Tribe member manipulates another light, the symbol of the Corps corresponding to that light is projected in front of the Indigo Tribe emblem painted on his or her forehead.

In the bonding process, the indigo ring forces its wearer to feel nothing but compassion. By blocking out all other emotions, the wearer can channel other emotions without being affected by them. The ring is classified as a parasite type like the orange ring, but differs in that it bonds most effectively with a user that lacks compassion. A wearer who has compassion before the bonding is unable to block out the other emotions, and either becomes heavily influenced by the channeled emotion or is unable to channel the emotion.

When the ring is removed, the wearer loses the memories of the time with the ring and reverts to his or her old behavior, although this can be undone by re-donning the ring. If the ring is removed for a longer term, the wearer may gradually regain some memories without the emotional modifications. The ring appears to only "brainwash" those who are reluctant to accept it; in the cases where the person voluntarily dons the ring, such as Ray Palmer in Blackest Night and John Stewart in War of the Green Lanterns, the wearer can use the powers without being mentally altered.

Other versions

The Lightsmiths
In the universe prior to the current one, groups managed to tap into the wellspring of power created by the Emotional Spectrum. In this universe those who tapped into the indigo light were known as the Lightsmiths of the Indigo Light of Empathy.

Star Trek/Green Lantern: The Spectrum War
In a possible future, when Nekron launches a new assault on the universe, rapidly recruiting the dead as his agents against the living as his forces claim even more lives, Ganthet triggers a 'last light' protocol that uses the last of his energy to send himself, the rings of six of the seven Corps (Minus a Green Lantern ring) and the last surviving members of the seven Corps to another universe to try and escape Nekron's assault, the various ring-wielders and the rings arriving in the new Star Trek universe. Although the Blue, Violet and Indigo rings find wielders in Pavel Chekov, Nyota Uhura and Leonard McCoy, the Yellow, Red, and Orange rings choose Klingon general Chang, a Gorn leader and a Romulan councillor as their wielders. While other members of the other Corps survive, McCoy's ring is apparently the only Indigo ring to make it into the new universe, as no other members of the Indigo Tribe are witnessed in the storyline. In the final confrontation with Nekron, McCoy transfers his ring to Spock on Captain Kirk's request, Kirk realising that Spock alone has sufficient emotional and psychological strength to channel all seven Corps and restore the White entity to vanquish Nekron.

In other media

Video games
The Indigo Tribe appear in Lego Batman 3: Beyond Gotham, with Indigo-1 appearing as a playable character voiced by Kari Wahlgren. She was captured by Brainiac, who sought to use her and other Lanterns to power his shrink ray so he can use it on Earth. However, the device overloads and teleports Indigo-1 to Nok. When Martian Manhunter, Cyborg, and the Flash arrive on the planet, they find the Indigo Tribe acting violent due to their Power Battery being damaged. Once the battery is rebuilt, the Indigo Tribe are cured of their violence and help the Justice League restore Earth to its normal size.
Proselyte appears in Injustice 2 as part of Atrocitus' ending.
The Indigo Tribe's homeworld appears in loading screens and background images depicted in DC Universe Online.

Merchandise

 Indigo-1 was featured in the DC Comics Super Hero Collection in 2010.
 Indigo-1 received a six-inch figure in the "Blackest Night" toyline.
 A six-inch Munk figure was included in the "Blackest Night" toyline four-pack.
 A light-up Indigo Ring was released by DC Direct along with rings for all the other Corps.

References

DC Comics aliens
DC Comics extraterrestrial superheroes
DC Comics superhero teams
Green Lantern characters
Characters created by Geoff Johns
Characters created by Ethan Van Sciver
Comics characters introduced in 2007